Ibukun Roberto Kehinde Ogunseye (born 16 May 1995) is an Italian professional footballer who plays as a striker for  club Foggia on loan from Modena. Born in Italy, Ogunseye is of Nigerian descent.

Club career
On 17 July 2021, Ogunseye signed a three-year contract with Serie C side Modena. He made his debut on 29 August in a 0–0 draw against Grosseto. On 6 September, he scored his first goal for the club in a 1–1 draw at home against Reggiana.

On 20 July 2022, Ogunseye moved on loan to Foggia, with an option to buy.

Honours 
Individual
 Coppa Italia Serie C top goalscorer: 2019–20

References

External links 
 
 

1995 births
Living people
Sportspeople from Mantua
Footballers from Lombardy
Italian people of Nigerian descent
Italian sportspeople of African descent
Italian footballers
Association football forwards
Serie B players
Serie C players
Serie D players
Inter Milan players
Calcio Montebelluna players
A.C. Prato players
Olbia Calcio 1905 players
A.S. Cittadella players
Modena F.C. players
Calcio Foggia 1920 players